State Road 101 in the U.S. state of Indiana is a north–south state highway in the eastern portion of Indiana that exists in four sections with a combined length of .

Route description
Only the segment of SR 101 that is concurrent with the U.S. Route 33 (US 33) are included as a part of the National Highway System (NHS).  The NHS is a network of highways that are identified as being most important for the economy, mobility and defense of the nation.  The highway is maintained by the Indiana Department of Transportation (INDOT) like all other State Roads in the state. The department tracks the traffic volumes along all state roads as a part of its maintenance responsibilities using a metric called average annual daily traffic (AADT). This measurement is a calculation of the traffic level along a segment of roadway for any average day of the year. In 2010, INDOT figured that lowest traffic levels were the 710 vehicles and 60 commercial vehicles used the highway daily between SR 124 and US 33. The peak traffic volumes were 5,740 vehicles and 450 commercial vehicles AADT between Sunman and I–74.

Southern section
Before expansion of the Speedway and extension of KY 1039, the route connected to Kentucky Route 1188, which ended just past the Ohio River at U.S. 42.

South central section
This sections of SR 101 begins at U.S. Route 50 (US 50) and heads north towards Milan. The road passes through rural farmland with a few houses as a two-lane highway. The road turns towards the northeast just south of SR 48. After SR 48 the highway turns back due north. This section ends at an interchange with Interstate 74 (I–74) in Penntown.

North central section
SR 101 runs concurrent with SR 1 north and then SR 101 heads northeast, leaving SR 1. The highway curves around Brookville Lake and continues due north towards Liberty. The road crosses into Union County and turns northeast again, ending at an intersection with US 27 and SR 44 in Liberty.

Northern section

The road enters Pleasant Mills and has a short concurrency with US 33. North of Pleasant Mills, the road crosses over the St. Marys River. After the river, the road enters Rivare and starts a concurrency with US 224. The concurrency heads west leaving Rivare heading towards Decatur. The concurrency ends when SR 101 turns back north and US 224 continues towards the west. SR 101 crosses into Allen County and has an intersection with US 30 near Townley. After US 30, the road has an all-way stop at old SR 14, now known as Dawkins Road. After Dawkins Road the road crosses the Norfolk Southern Railway. Then the road enters Woodburn and makes a sharp curve heading towards the east, followed by another curve back north. North of Woodburn, the highway has an interchange with US 24 and crosses the Maumee River. After the river, the road makes a sharp curve towards the west, followed by a sharp curve back north. North of the curves the route has an intersection with SR 37 and crosses into DeKalb County, within which it crosses the St. Joseph River. The northern terminus of SR 101 at an intersection with SR 8 and SR 1.

Major intersections

See also
List of Indiana state highways

References

External links

 Indiana Highway Ends: SR 101

101
Transportation in Switzerland County, Indiana
Transportation in Ripley County, Indiana
Transportation in Franklin County, Indiana
Transportation in Union County, Indiana
Transportation in Adams County, Indiana
Transportation in Allen County, Indiana
Transportation in DeKalb County, Indiana